Along Came John is the debut album by American organist John Patton, recorded in 1963 and released on the Blue Note label.

Reception

The AllMusic review by Stephen Thomas Erlewine awarded the album 4 stars and stated "These original compositions may not all be memorable, but the band's interaction, improvisation, and solos are. Tenor saxophonists Fred Jackson and Harold Vick provide good support, as well, but the show belongs to Patton, Green, and Dixon, who once again prove they are one of the finest soul-jazz combos of their era".

Track listing
All compositions by John Patton except where noted

 "The Silver Meter" (Ben Dixon) – 5:41
 "I'll Never Be Free" (Bennie Benjamin, George Weiss) – 5:03
 "Spiffy Diffy" (Dixon) – 6:02
 "Along Came John" – 6:03
 "Gee Gee" – 6:01
 "Pig Foots" (Dixon) – 5:44

Personnel
John Patton – organ
Fred Jackson, Harold Vick – tenor saxophone
Grant Green – guitar
Ben Dixon – drums

References

Blue Note Records albums
John Patton (musician) albums
1963 debut albums
Albums recorded at Van Gelder Studio
Albums produced by Alfred Lion